Colin de Verdière's invariant is a graph parameter  for any graph G, introduced by Yves Colin de Verdière in 1990. It was motivated by the study of the maximum multiplicity of the second eigenvalue of certain Schrödinger operators.

Definition
Let  be a loopless simple graph with vertex set . Then  is the largest corank of any symmetric matrix  such that:
 (M1) for all  with :  if , and  if ;
 (M2)  has exactly one negative eigenvalue, of multiplicity 1;
 (M3) there is no nonzero matrix  such that  and such that  if either  or  hold.

Characterization of known graph families
Several well-known families of graphs can be characterized in terms of their Colin de Verdière invariants:
 if and only if G has no edges;
 if and only if G is a linear forest (a disjoint union of paths);
 if and only if G is outerplanar;
 if and only if G is planar;
 if and only if G is  linklessly embeddable in R3.

These same families of graphs also show up in connections between the Colin de Verdière invariant of a graph and the structure of its complement:
If the complement of an n-vertex graph is a linear forest, then ;
If the complement of an n-vertex graph is outerplanar, then ;
If the complement of an n-vertex graph is planar, then .

Graph minors
A minor of a graph is another graph formed from it by contracting edges and by deleting edges and vertices. The Colin de Verdière invariant is minor-monotone, meaning that taking a minor of a graph can only decrease or leave unchanged its invariant:
If H is a minor of G then .
By the Robertson–Seymour theorem, for every k there exists a finite set H of graphs such that the graphs with invariant at most k are the same as the graphs that do not have any member of H as a minor.  lists these sets of forbidden minors for k ≤ 3; for k = 4 the set of forbidden minors consists of the seven graphs in the Petersen family, due to the two characterizations of the linklessly embeddable graphs as the graphs with μ ≤ 4 and as the graphs with no Petersen family minor. For k = 5 the set of forbidden minors include 78 graphs of Heawood family, and it is conjectured that there are no more.

Chromatic number
 conjectured that any graph with Colin de Verdière invariant μ may be colored with at most μ + 1 colors. For instance, the linear forests have invariant 1, and can be 2-colored; the outerplanar graphs have invariant two, and can be 3-colored; the planar graphs have invariant 3, and (by the four color theorem) can be 4-colored.

Other properties
If a graph has crossing number , it has Colin de Verdière invariant at most . For instance, the two Kuratowski graphs  and  can both be drawn with a single crossing, and have Colin de Verdière invariant at most four.

Influence
The Colin de Verdière invariant is defined through a class of matrices corresponding to the graph instead of just a single matrix. Along the same lines other graph parameters can be defined and studied along the same lines, such as the minimum rank, minimum semidefinite rank and minimum skew rank.

Notes

References 
.
.

.
.

Graph invariants
Graph minor theory